Lode Runner 2 is a puzzle-platform game released in 1998 for Mac OS and Microsoft Windows. It is a sequel to Lode Runner and its remakes. Like the earlier Lode Runner's Rescue, Lode Runner 2 has isometric-perspective 2D graphics. It was developed by Presage Software and distributed by GT Interactive for Microsoft Windows and MacSoft for the Macintosh.

Gameplay

Players can play as a male or female Lode Runner, named Jake Peril and Jane according to the manual, but the player's default name is Digmo (which is changeable). The goal is to collect gold to advance to the next level, avoiding the Mad Monks along the way. Players are able to move in six different directions on a freeform map (accounting for falling and going up and down ladders). There are separate levels designed for cooperation, as well as deathmatch in multiplayer mode.

Development
The game uses a distant perspective so as to minimize scrolling. Initially the developers were using a more conventional perspective, but while playing the game they found they were frustrated by their inability to see key elements that were not immediately at hand.

The game was announced in April 1998.Lode Runner creator Doug Smith retained co-ownership of the Lode Runner intellectual property, and served as a consultant and level designer on Lode Runner 2.

Reception

Macworlds Michael Gowan wrote that Lode Runner 2 "lacks the original game's most attractive feature: simplicity. The 3-D perspective requires that you move diagonally rather than left and right, which can be confounding".

References

External links

1998 video games
Classic Mac OS games
Cooperative video games
GT Interactive games
MacSoft games
Multiplayer and single-player video games
Presage Software games
Puzzle-platform games
Video games developed in the United States
Video games featuring protagonists of selectable gender
Video games with isometric graphics
Windows games